Tentaoculus haptricola is a species of small sea snail, a marine gastropod mollusk in the family Pseudococculinidae, the false limpets.

Distribution
This marine species is endemic to New Zealand.

References

External links
 To GenBank (1 nucleotides; 0 proteins)
 To USNM Invertebrate Zoology Mollusca Collection
 To World Register of Marine Species

Pseudococculinidae
Gastropods described in 1986